Bento Costa Lima Leite de Alburquerque Júnior (born 3 August 1958) is a Brazilian admiral who had served as Minister of Mines and Energy.

Biography
Joined the Brazilian Navy in 1973, occupied many offices in the institution. Among them, as military observer in the UN Peacekeeping Missions in the sectors of Sarajevo, Bosnia and Herzegovina, Dubrovnik, in the former Yugoslavia, Commander in the Submarine Base Admiral Castro e Silva, Commander-in-Chief of the Squad and Secretary of Science, Technology and Innovation of the Brazilian Navy.

Headed the Division of Technology of the Staff in 2006, which later became the Secretariat of Science, Technology and Innovation of the Navy. Between 2007 and 2008, he became parliamentary chief-assistant of the Navy Commander Cabinet, participating in the agreements of strategic partnership of the Program of Development of Submarines (Prosub) between France and Brazil.

Later, Albuquerque became Commander of the Submarine Force and Chief of Staff of the Navy Commander. In 2016, headed the General Directory of Nuclear and Technological Development of the Navy. Current, became the new Minister of Mines and Energy,

On 18 March 2020, Costa Lima had tested positive for COVID-19.

Medals and awards
During his career, Admiral Bento received many medals in awards, being some of them:

  Order of the Naval Merit - Commander
  Order of Defence Merit - Commander
  Order of Military Merit - Commander
  Order of Aeronautical Merit - Commander
  Order of the Military Judiciary Merit - High Distinction

References

1958 births
Living people
People from Rio de Janeiro (city)
Brazilian admirals
Energy ministers of Brazil